Ronald Takács (born 26 January 1998) is a Hungarian professional footballer who plays as a midfielder for Budafok.

Club statistics

Updated to games played as of 15 May 2021.

References

External links
MLSZ 
HLSZ 

1998 births
Living people
Hungarian footballers
Hungary youth international footballers
Ukrainian footballers
Ukrainian people of Hungarian descent
Association football defenders
MTK Budapest FC players
FK Inter Bratislava players
Budafoki LC footballers
Nemzeti Bajnokság I players
2. Liga (Slovakia) players
Hungarian expatriate footballers
Expatriate footballers in Slovakia
Hungarian expatriate sportspeople in Slovakia
Sportspeople from Zakarpattia Oblast